The 2022–23 season is the 77th season in the history of U.C. Sampdoria and their 11th consecutive season in the top flight. The club are participating in Serie A and the Coppa Italia.

Players

First-team squad

Out on loan
.

Pre-season and friendlies

Competitions

Overall record

Serie A

League table

Results summary

Results by round

Matches 
The league fixtures were announced on 24 June 2022.

Coppa Italia

Notes

References 

U.C. Sampdoria seasons
Sampdoria